Aquaponics is a food production system that couples aquaculture (raising aquatic animals such as fish, crayfish, snails or prawns in tanks) with hydroponics (cultivating plants in water) whereby the nutrient-rich aquaculture water is fed to hydroponically grown plants.

As existing hydroponic and aquaculture farming techniques form the basis of all aquaponic systems, the size, complexity, and types of foods grown in an aquaponic system can vary as much as any system found in either distinct farming discipline.

History 

Aquaponics has ancient roots, although there is some debate on its first occurrence:
Aztec cultivated agricultural islands known as chinampas in a system considered by some to be an early form of aquaponics for agricultural use, where plants were raised on stationary (or sometime movable) islands in lake shallows and waste materials dredged from the Chinampa canals and surrounding cities were used to manually irrigate the plants.
South China and the whole of Southeast Asia, where rice was cultivated and farmed in paddy fields in combination with fish, are cited as examples of early aquaponics systems, although the technology had been brought by Chinese settlers who had migrated from Yunnan around 5 AD. These polycultural farming systems existed in many Far Eastern countries and raised fish such as the oriental loach (泥鳅, ドジョウ), swamp eel (黄鳝, 田鰻), common carp (鯉魚, コイ) and crucian carp (鯽魚) as well as pond snails (田螺) in the paddies.
The 13th century Chinese agricultural manual Wang Zhen's Book on Farming (王禎農書) described floating wooden rafts which were piled with mud and dirt and which were used for growing rice, wild rice, and fodder. Such floating planters were employed in regions constituting the modern provinces of Jiangsu, Zhejiang, and Fujian. The agricultural work also references earlier Chinese texts, which indicated that floating raft rice cultivation was being used as early as the Tang Dynasty (6th century) and Northern Song Dynasty (8th century) periods of Chinese history.

Floating aquaponics systems on polycultural fish ponds have been installed in China in more recent years on a large scale. They are used to grow rice, wheat and canna lily and other crops, with some installations exceeding .

The development of modern aquaponics is often attributed to the various works of the New Alchemy Institute and the works of Dr. Mark McMurtry et al. at the North Carolina State University, who devised an "Integrated Aqua-Vegeculture System" (iAVs) based on the combination of aquaculture and sand-based grow beds.
Inspired by the successes of the New Alchemy Institute and McMurtry's iAVs, other institutes soon followed suit. Starting in 1979, Dr. James Rakocy and his colleagues at the University of the Virgin Islands researched and developed the use of deep water culture hydroponic grow beds in a large-scale aquaponics system.
Other institutes focused their research on "ebb and flow" systems (also known as "flood and drain"), which were partially based on the original ideas developed at North Carolina State University, but where coarse media (such as gravel or expanded clay) replaced sand, while bell syphons allowed an ebb-and-flow irrigation cycle, such systems are also known as "Speraneo Systems" because they are based on ideas developed in the 1990s by Tom and Paula Speraneo, owners of an aquaponics farm in Missouri.

The first aquaponics research in Canada was a small system added onto existing aquaculture research at a research station in Lethbridge, Alberta. Canada saw a rise in aquaponics setups throughout the '90s, predominantly as commercial installations raising high-value crops such as trout and lettuce. A setup based on the deepwater system developed at the University of Virgin Islands was built in a greenhouse at Brooks, Alberta where Dr. Nick Savidov and colleagues researched aquaponics from a background of plant science. The team made findings on rapid root growth in aquaponics systems and on closing the solid-waste loop and found that, owing to certain advantages in the system over traditional aquaculture, the system can run well at a low pH level, which is favored by plants but not fish.

Parts of an aquaponic system 
 
Aquaponics consists of two main parts, with the aquaculture part for raising aquatic animals and the hydroponics part for growing plants. Aquatic effluents, resulting from uneaten feed or raising animals like fish, accumulate in water due to the closed-system recirculation of most aquaculture systems. The effluent-rich water becomes toxic to the aquatic animal in high concentrations but this contains nutrients essential for plant growth. Although consisting primarily of these two parts, aquaponics systems are usually grouped into several components or subsystems responsible for the effective removal of solid wastes, for adding bases to neutralize acids, or for maintaining water oxygenation. Typical components include:
 Rearing tank: the tanks for raising and feeding the fish;
 Settling basin: a unit for catching uneaten food and detached biofilms, and for settling out fine particulates;
 Biofilter: a place where the nitrification bacteria can grow and convert ammonia into nitrates, which are usable by the plants;
 Hydroponics subsystem: the portion of the system where plants are grown by absorbing excess nutrients from the water;
 Sump: the lowest point in the system where the water flows to and from which it is pumped back to the rearing tanks.
Depending on the sophistication and cost of the aquaponics system, the units for solids removal, biofiltration, and/or the hydroponics subsystem may be combined into one unit or subsystem, which prevents the water from flowing directly from the aquaculture part of the system to the hydroponics part. By utilizing gravel or sand as plant supporting medium, solids are captured and the medium has enough surface area for fixed-film nitrification. The ability to combine biofiltration and hydroponics allows for aquaponic system, in many cases, to eliminate the need for an expensive, separate biofilter.

Live components 
An aquaponic system depends on different live components to work successfully. The three main live components are plants, fish (or other aquatic creatures) and bacteria. Some systems also include additional live components like worms.

Plants 

Many plants are suitable for aquaponic systems, though which ones work for a specific system depends on the maturity and stocking density of the fish. These factors influence the concentration of nutrients from the fish effluent and how much of those nutrients are made available to the plant roots via bacteria.

Green leaf vegetables with low to medium nutrient requirements are well adapted to aquaponic systems, including chinese cabbage, lettuce, basil, spinach, chives, herbs, and watercress.

Other plants, such as tomatoes, cucumbers, and peppers, have higher nutrient requirements and will do well only in mature aquaponic systems with high stocking densities of fish.

Plants that are common in salads have some of the greatest success in aquaponics, including cucumbers, shallots, tomatoes, lettuce, capsicum, red salad onions and snow peas.

Some profitable plants for aquaponic systems include chinese cabbage, lettuce, basil, roses, tomatoes, okra, cantaloupe and bell peppers.

Other species of vegetables and/or fruit that grow well in an aquaponic system include watercress, basil, coriander, parsley, lemongrass, sage, beans, peas, kohlrabi, taro, Pomegranate, radishes, strawberries, melons, onions, turnips, parsnips, sweet potato, cauliflower, cabbage, broccoli, and eggplant as well as the choys that are used for stir fries.

Fish (or other aquatic creatures) 
 
 
Freshwater fish are the most common aquatic animal raised using aquaponics due to their ability to tolerate crowding. Freshwater crayfish and prawns are also sometimes used, as they excrete nutrient rich feces. There is a branch of aquaponics using saltwater fish, called saltwater aquaponics. There are many species of warmwater and cold-water fish that adapt well to aquaculture systems.

In practice, tilapia are the most popular fish for home and commercial projects that are intended to raise edible fish because it is a warmwater fish species that can tolerate crowding and changing water conditions. Barramundi, silver perch, eel-tailed catfish or tandanus catfish, jade perch and Murray cod are also used. For temperate climates when there isn't ability or desire to maintain water temperature, bluegill and catfish are suitable fish species for home systems.

Koi and goldfish may also be used, if the fish in the system need not be edible.

Other suitable fish include channel catfish, rainbow trout, perch, common carp, Arctic char, largemouth bass and striped bass.

Bacteria 

Nitrification, the aerobic conversion of ammonia into nitrates, is one of the most important functions in an aquaponic system as it reduces the toxicity of the water for fish, and allows the resulting nitrate compounds to be removed by the plants for nourishment. Ammonia is steadily released into the water through the excreta and gills of fish as a product of their metabolism, but must be filtered out of the water since higher concentrations of ammonia (commonly between 0.5 and 1 ppm) can impair growth, cause widespread damage to tissues, decrease resistance to disease and even kill the fish. Although plants can absorb ammonia from the water to some degree, nitrates are assimilated more easily, thereby efficiently reducing the toxicity of the water for fish. Ammonia can be converted into safer nitrogenous compounds through combined healthy populations of 2 types of bacteria: Nitrosomonas which convert ammonia into nitrites, and Nitrobacter which then convert nitrites into nitrates. While nitrite is still harmful to fish due to its ability to create methemoglobin, which cannot bind oxygen, by attaching to hemoglobin, nitrates are able to be tolerated at high levels by fish.
For this, nitrite levels must be maintained at concentrations lower than 1ppm. Nitrate, which is much safer for fish, can be tolerated at concentrations of over 150ppm. Typically, nitrogen cycling (system cycling) must conducted for 3-5 weeks in order to achieve and maintain these ideal concentrations of nitrogen compounds. High surface area provides more space for the growth of nitrifying bacteria. Grow bed material choices require careful analysis of the surface area, price and maintainability considerations.

Hydroponic subsystem 
Plants are grown in hydroponics systems, with their roots immersed in the nutrient-rich effluent water. This enables them to filter out the ammonia that is toxic to the aquatic animals, or its metabolites. After the water has passed through the hydroponic subsystem, it is cleaned and oxygenated, and can return to the aquaculture vessels. This cycle is continuous. Common aquaponic applications of hydroponic systems include:
 Deep-water raft aquaponics: styrofoam rafts floating in a relatively deep aquaculture basin in troughs. Raft tanks can be constructed to be quite large, and enable seedlings to be transplanted at one end of the tank while fully grown plants are harvested at the other, thus ensuring optimal floor space usage.
 Recirculating aquaponics: solid media such as gravel or clay beads, held in a container that is flooded with water from the aquaculture. This type of aquaponics is also known as closed-loop aquaponics.
 Reciprocating aquaponics: solid media in a container that is alternately flooded and drained utilizing different types of siphon drains. This type of aquaponics is also known as flood-and-drain aquaponics or ebb-and-flow aquaponics.
 Nutrient film technique channels: plants are grown in lengthy narrow channels, with a film of nutrient-filled water constantly flowing past the plant roots. Due to the small amount of water and narrow channels, helpful bacteria cannot live there and therefore a bio filter is required for this method.
 Other systems use towers that are trickle-fed from the top, horizontal PVC pipes with holes for the pots, plastic barrels cut in half with gravel or rafts in them. Each approach has its own benefits.

Since plants at different growth stages require different amounts of minerals and nutrients, plant harvesting is staggered with seedlings growing at the same time as mature plants. This ensures stable nutrient content in the water because of continuous symbiotic cleansing of toxins from the water.

Biofilter 
In an aquaponics system, the bacteria responsible for the conversion of ammonia to usable nitrates for plants form a biofilm on all solid surfaces throughout the system that are in constant contact with the water. The submerged roots of the vegetables combined have a large surface area where many bacteria can accumulate. Together with the concentrations of ammonia and nitrites in the water, the surface area determines the speed with which nitrification takes place. Care for these bacterial colonies is important as to regulate the full assimilation of ammonia and nitrite. This is why most aquaponics systems include a biofiltering unit, which helps facilitate growth of these microorganisms. Typically, after a system has stabilized ammonia levels range from 0.25 to .50 ppm; nitrite levels range from 0.0 to 0.25 ppm, and nitrate levels range from 5 to 150 ppm. During system startup, systems take several weeks to begin the nitrification process.  As a result, spikes may occur in the levels of ammonia (up to 6.0 ppm) and nitrite (up to 15 ppm) as the nitrosomonas and nitrobacter bacteria have yet to establish populations within the system. Nitrate levels peak later in the startup phase as the system completes nitrogen cycles and maintains a healthy biofilter and these bacteria grow into a mature colony. with nitrate levels peaking later in the startup phase. In the nitrification process ammonia is oxidized into nitrite, which releases hydrogen ions into the water. Overtime the water's pH will slowly drop, non-sodium bases such as potassium hydroxide or calcium hydroxide can be used to neutralize the water's pH if insufficient quantities are naturally present in the water to provide a buffer against acidification. In addition, selected minerals or nutrients such as iron can be added in addition to the fish waste that serves as the main source of nutrients to plants.

A good way to deal with solids buildup in aquaponics is the use of worms, which liquefy the solid organic matter so that it can be utilized by the plants and/or other animals in the system. For a worm-only growing method, please see Vermiponics.

Operation 
The five main inputs to the system are water, oxygen, light, feed given to the aquatic animals, and electricity to pump, filter, and oxygenate the water. Spawn or fry may be added to replace grown fish that are taken out from the system to retain a stable system. In terms of outputs, an aquaponics system may continually yield plants such as vegetables grown in hydroponics, and edible aquatic species raised in an aquaculture.

Ten primary guiding principles for creating successful aquaponics systems were issued by Dr. James Rakocy, the director of the aquaponics research team at the University of the Virgin Islands, based on extensive research done as part of the Agricultural Experiment Station aquaculture program.
Use a feeding rate ratio for design calculations
Keep feed input relatively constant
Supplement with calcium, potassium and iron
Ensure good aeration
Remove solids
Be careful with aggregates
Oversize pipes
Use biological pest control
Ensure adequate biofiltration
Control pH

Feed source
As in most aquaculture based systems, stock feed often consists of fish meal derived from lower-value species. Ongoing depletion of wild fish stocks makes this practice unsustainable. Organic fish feeds may prove to be a viable alternative that relieves this concern. Other alternatives include growing duckweed with an aquaponics system that feeds the same fish grown on the system, excess worms grown from vermiculture composting, using prepared kitchen scraps, as well as growing black soldier fly larvae to feed to the fish using composting grub growers.

Plant nutrients
Like hydroponics, a few minerals and micronutrients can be added to improve plant growth. Iron is the most deficient nutrient in aquaponics, but it can be added through mixing Iron Chelate powder with water. Potassium can be added as potassium sulfate through foliar spray. Less vital nutrients include magnesium as epsom salt, calcium as calcium chloride, and boron. Biological filtration of aquaculture wastes yield high nitrate concentrations, which is great for leafy greens. For flowering plants with high nutrient demands, it is recommended to introduce supplemental nutrients such as magnesium, calcium, potassium, and phosphorus. Common sources are sulfate of potash, potassium bicarbonate, monoammonium phosphate, etc. Nutrient deficiency in wastewater from fish component (RAS) can be completely masked using raw or mineralized sludge, usually containing 3–17 times higher nutrient concentrations. RAS effluents (wastewater and sludge combined) contain adequate N, P, Mg, Ca, S, Fe, Zn, Cu, Ni to meet most aquaponic crop needs. Potassium is generally deficient requiring full-fledged fertilization. Micronutrients B, Mo are partly sufficient and can be easily ameliorated by increasing sludge release. The presumption surrounding 'definite' phyto-toxic sodium levels in RAS effluents should be reconsidered – practical solutions available too. No threat of heavy metal accumulation exists within the aquaponics loop.

Water usage
Aquaponic systems do not typically discharge or exchange water under normal operation, but instead, recirculate and reuse water very effectively. The system relies on the relationship between the animals and the plants to maintain a stable aquatic environment that experience a minimum of fluctuation in ambient nutrient and oxygen levels. Plants are able to recover dissolved nutrients from the circulating water, meaning that less water is discharged and the water exchange rate can be minimized. Water is added only to replace water loss from absorption and transpiration by plants, evaporation into the air from surface water, overflow from the system from rainfall, and removal of biomass such as settled solid wastes from the system. As a result, aquaponics uses approximately 2% of the water that a conventionally irrigated farm requires for the same vegetable production. This allows for aquaponic production of both crops and fish in areas where water or fertile land is scarce. Aquaponic systems can also be used to replicate controlled wetland conditions. Constructed wetlands can be useful for biofiltration and treatment of typical household sewage. The nutrient-filled overflow water can be accumulated in catchment tanks, and reused to accelerate growth of crops planted in soil, or it may be pumped back into the aquaponic system to top up the water level.

Energy usage

Aquaponic installations rely in varying degrees on man-made energy, technological solutions, and environmental control to achieve recirculation and water/ambient temperatures. However, if a system is designed with energy conservation in mind, using alternative energy and a reduced number of pumps by letting the water flow downwards as much as possible, it can be highly energy efficient. While careful design can minimize the risk, aquaponics systems can have multiple 'single points of failure' where problems such as an electrical failure or a pipe blockage can lead to a complete loss of fish stock.

Fish stocking 
In order for aquaponic systems to be financially successful and make a profit whilst also covering its operating expenses, the hydroponic plant components and fish rearing components need to almost constantly be at maximum production capacity. To keep the bio-mass of fish in the system at its maximum (without limiting fish growth), there are three main stocking method that can help maintain this maximum.
 Sequential rearing: Multiple age groups of fish share a rearing tank, and when an age group reaches market size they are selectively harvested and replaced with the same amount of fingerlings. Downsides to this method include stressing out the entire pool of fish during each harvest, missing fish resulting in a waste of food/space, and the difficulty of keeping accurate records with frequent harvests.
 Stock splitting: Large quantities of fingerlings are stocked at once and then split into two groups once the tank hits maximum capacity, which is easier to record and eliminates fish being "forgotten". A stress-free way of doing this operation is via "swimways" that connect various rearing tanks and a series of hatches/moving screens/pumps that move the fish around.
 Multiple rearing units: Entire groups of fish are moved to larger rearing tanks once their current tank hits maximum capacity. Such systems usually have 2–4 tanks that share a filtration system, and when the largest tank is harvested, the other fish groups are each moved up into a bigger tank whilst the smallest tank is restocked with fingerlings. It is also common for there to be several rearing tanks yet no ways to move fish between them, which eliminates the labor of moving fish and allows each tank to be undisturbed during harvesting, even if the space usage is inefficient when the fish are fingerlings.
Ideally the bio-mass of fish in the rearing tanks doesn't exceed 0.5 lbs/gallon, in order to reduce stress from crowding, efficiently feed the fish, and promote healthy growth.

Disease and pest management 
Although pesticides can normally be used to take care of insects on crops, in an aquaponic system the use of pesticides would threaten the fish ecosystem. On the other hand, if the fish acquire parasites or diseases, therapeutants cannot be used as the plants would absorb them. In order to maintain the symbiotic relationship between the plants and the fish, non-chemical methods such as traps, physical barriers and biological control (such as parasitic wasps/ladybugs to control white flies/aphids) should be used to control pests. The most effective organic pesticide is Neem oil, but only in small quantities to minimize spill over fish's water.. Commercialization of aquaponics is often stalled by bottlenecks in pest and disease management. The use of chemical control methods is highly complicated for all systems. While insecticides and herbicides are replaceable by well‐established commercial biocontrol measures, fungicides and nematicides are still relevant in aquaponics. Monitoring and cultural control are the first approaches to contain pest population. Biological controls, in general, are adaptable to a larger extent. Non‐chemical prophylactic measures are highly proficient for pest and disease prevention in all designs.

Automation, monitoring, and control 
Many have tried to create automatic control and monitoring systems and some of these demonstrated a level of success. For instance, researchers were able to introduce automation in a small scale aquaponic system to achieve a cost-effective and sustainable farming system. Commercial development of automation technologies has also emerged. For instance, a company has developed a system capable of automating the repetitive tasks of farming and features a machine learning algorithm that can automatically detect and eliminate diseased or underdeveloped plants. A 3.75-acre aquaponics facility that claims to be the first indoor salmon farm in the United States also includes an automated technology. The aquaponic machine has made notable strides in the documenting and gathering of information regarding aquaponics.

Economic viability 
Aquaponics offers a diverse and stable polyculture system that allows farmers to grow vegetables and raise fish at the same time. By having two sources of profit, farmers can continue to earn money even if the market for either fish or plants goes through a low cycle. The flexibility of an aquaponic system allows it to grow a large variety of crops including ordinary vegetables, herbs, flowers and aquatic plants to cater to a broad spectrum of consumers. Herbs, lettuce and speciality greens such as basil or spinach are especially well suited for aquaponic systems due to their low nutritional needs. For the growing number of environmentally conscious consumers, products from aquaponic systems are organic and pesticide free, whilst also leaving a small environmental footprint. Aquaponic systems additionally are economically efficient due to low water usage, effective nutrient cycling and needing little land to operate. Because soil isn't needed and only a little bit of water is required, aquaponic systems can be set up in areas that have traditionally poor soil quality or contaminated water. More importantly, aquaponic systems are usually free of weeds, pests and diseases that would affect soil, which allows them to consistently and quickly produce high quality crops to sell.

The research pertaining to aquaponic systems, and their economic viability is still very limited compared to conventional hydroponic systems. With the research that is available, the economic viability of aquaponic businesses must be determined case by case. There are many variables including system design, seasonal weather, and local costs of energy or land that factor into the profitability of aquaponic businesses. According to a study that included 208 aquaponic businesses in the United States, the average investment cost of aquaponic businesses was $5,000 - $10,000 and only 10% of businesses were reporting more than $50,000 in annual revenue.

There are two primary aquaponic systems: Single Recirculating Aquaponic Systems (SRAPS or coupled systems) and Double Recirculating Aquaponic Systems (DRAPS or decoupled systems). The primary difference is that in a DRAPS system, the water from the aquaculture (fish) system is used to provide nutrients to the hydroponic (plant) system but the two systems operate autonomously of each other. Unlike with SRAPS, a grower can add synthetic fertilizer into a DRAPS system without hurting the fish. DRAPS tomato systems that use fertilizers in addition to fish waste can provide the same level of production as conventional hydroponic systems while reducing fertilizer usage by 23.6%. SRAPS systems are not able to mimic these results. Additional research shows the support that aquaponic systems can use 14% less fertilizer than hydroponic systems. Despite this reduction, a grower should determine if the cost of maintaining aquaculture is cheaper than the use of extra fertilizer in hydroponics.

Other non-system-based barriers to the economic success of aquaponic systems could include that these systems require a high degree of knowledge in multiple disciplines, a lack of financing opportunities for aquaponics, and the fact that the general public doesn't understand what aquaponics is. An aquaponics business may require additional branding strategies compared to hydroponics, which is a technology that is relatively well known at this point in the United States.

Current examples 

Europe
The Urban Farming Company, an organization based out of Switzerland, has been created to offer a method of rooftop based aquaponic growing systems to businesses. Its purpose is to offer fresh, sustainable produce to local urban areas. 
In March 2018 the European Aquaponics Association was established among European countries. This opened up an organization for European countries to continue aquaponic research and the implementation of aquaponic practices. 
EcoPonics is an aquaponics company based out of Iceland that is joining similar companies from Iceland, Denmark, and Spain to advocate for the implementation of commercial and competitive Aquaponics systems in European countries.
The Caribbean island of Barbados created an initiative to start aquaponics systems at home, called the aquaponic machine, with revenue generated by selling produce to tourists in an effort to reduce growing dependence on imported food.
Asia
In Bangladesh, the world's most densely populated country, most farmers use agrochemicals to enhance food production and storage life, though the country lacks oversight on safe levels of chemicals in foods for human consumption. To combat this issue, a team led by M.A. Salam at the Department of Aquaculture of Bangladesh Agricultural University has created plans for a low-cost aquaponics system to provide organic produce and fish for people living in adverse climatic conditions such as the salinity-prone southern area and the flood-prone haor area in the eastern region. Salam's work innovates a form of subsistence farming for micro-production goals at the community and personal levels whereas design work by Chowdhury and Graff was aimed exclusively at the commercial level, the latter of the two approaches take advantage of economies of scale.
An aquaponic gardening system is developed for use on rooftops in Gaza City.
In Malaysia Alor Gajah, Melaka, Organization 'Persatuan Akuakutur Malaysia' takes innovative approach in aquaponics by growing Lobster in aquaponics.
Aquaponics in India aims to provide aspiring farmers with aquaponics solutions for commercial and backyard operation.
North America
Dakota College at Bottineau in Bottineau, North Dakota has an aquaponics program that gives students the ability to obtain a certificate or an AAS degree in aquaponics.
The Smith Road facility in Denver started pilot program of aquaponics to feed 800 to 1,000 inmates at the Denver Jail, and a neighboring downtown facility which consists of 1,500 inmates and 700 officers.
VertiFarms in New Orleans targets corporate rooftops for vertical farming, accruing up to 90 corporate clients for rooftop vertical farming in 2013.
Windy Drumlins Farm in Wisconsin redesigns aquaponic-solar greenhouse for extreme weather conditions which can endure extremely cold climate.
Volunteer operation in Nicaragua "Amigos for Christ" manages its plantation for feeding 900+ poverty-stricken school children by using nutrients from aquaponic methods.
Verticulture in Bedstuy utilizes old Pfizer manufacturing plant for producing basil in commercial scale through aquaponics, yielding 30-40 pounds of basil a week.
Upward Farms in New York expands to full-scale commercial facility, which will generate 130,000 pounds of greens and 50,000 pounds of fish a year.
There has been a shift towards community integration of aquaponics, such as the nonprofit foundation Growing Power that offers Milwaukee youth job opportunities and training while growing food for their community. The model has spawned several satellite projects in other cities, such as New Orleans where the Vietnamese fisherman community has suffered from the Deepwater Horizon oil spill, and in the South Bronx in New York City.
Whispering Roots is a non-profit organization in Omaha, Nebraska that provides fresh, locally grown, healthy food for socially and economically disadvantaged communities by using aquaponics, hydroponics and urban farming.
Recently, aquaponics has been moving towards indoor production systems. In cities like Chicago, entrepreneurs are utilizing vertical designs to grow food year round. These systems can be used to grow food year round with minimal to no waste.
Caribbean
Fusion Farms in Mayagüez, Puerto Rico is the first hurricane-protected vertical farming operation using controlled environment aquaponics (CEAq) that has been designated by the Government of Puerto Rico as a 'Company of Strategic Importance' due to the contribution they are making to help the island solve Food Security and Food sovereignty.
Miscellaneous 
In addition, aquaponic gardeners from all around the world are gathering in online community sites and forums to share their experiences and promote the development of this form of gardening as well as creating extensive resources on how to build home systems.
There are various modular systems made for the public that utilize aquaponic systems to produce organic vegetables and herbs, and provide indoor decor at the same time. These systems can serve as a source of herbs and vegetables indoors. Universities are promoting research on these modular systems as they get more popular among city dwellers.

See also
 Hydroponics
 Vertical farming

References

External links

 
Aquaculture
Hydroculture
Hydroponics